The Romanian National Unity Party (PUNR) was a nationalist political party in Romania between 1990 and 2006.

History
The PUNR was the first nationalist party in post-communist Romania, created in 1990, with Gheorghe Funar emerging as its leader. In the 1990 general elections the party ran as part of the Alliance for Romanian Unity (AUR) alongside the Republican Party (PR). The alliance received 2.1% of the Chamber of Deputies vote in the 1990 general elections, winning nine seats. It also received 2.2% of the Senate vote, winning two seats.

Funar went on to become mayor of Cluj-Napoca. In that office, he would promote Romanian national symbols, especially the blue, yellow and red flag, throughout the city. He was the party's candidate for president in the 1992 general elections, finishing third with 11% of the vote. In the parliamentary elections the PUNR emerged as the fourth-largest party in Parliament, winning 14 seats in the Senate and 30 seats in the Chamber of Deputies.

Funar was the party's presidential candidate again in the 1996 elections, but finished sixth in a field of 16 candidates, receiving only 3.2% of the vote. The PUNR also lost seats in Parliament, being reduced to seven Senate seats and 18 seats in the Chamber of Deputies. The party did not nominate a presidential candidate in the 2000 elections, which saw its vote share fall to just 1.4%, resulting in it failing to cross the electoral threshold, losing its parliamentary representation.

Its last leader was former General Mircea Chelaru. On 12 February 2006, the PUNR was absorbed into the Conservative Party (PC).

Electoral history

Legislative elections

Notes:

Presidential elections

See also

 Greater Romania Party
 Romanian Hearth Union

References

Defunct political parties in Romania
Political parties established in 1990
1990 establishments in Romania
Political parties disestablished in 2006
2006 disestablishments in Romania
Conservative parties in Romania
Nationalist parties in Romania
Romanian nationalist parties
Right-wing parties in Romania
Anti-Hungarian sentiment in Romania